The following outline is provided as an overview of and topical guide to geography:

Geography – study of earth and its people.

Nature of geography

Geography as 

 an academic discipline – a body of knowledge given to − or received by − a disciple (student); a branch or sphere of knowledge, or field of study, that an individual has chosen to specialize in. Modern geography is an all-encompassing discipline that seeks to understand the Earth and its human and natural complexities − not merely where objects are, but how they have changed and come to be. Geography has been called 'the world discipline'.
 a field of science – widely recognized category of specialized expertise within science, and typically embodies its own terminology and nomenclature. This field will usually be represented by one or more scientific journals, where peer-reviewed research is published. There are many geography-related scientific journals.
 a natural science – field of academic scholarship that explores aspects of the natural environment (physical geography).
 a social science – field of academic scholarship that explores aspects of human society (human geography).
 an interdisciplinary field – a field that crosses traditional boundaries between academic disciplines or schools of thought, as new needs and professions have emerged. Many of the branches of physical geography are also branches of Earth science

Branches of geography 

As "the bridge between the human and physical sciences," geography is divided into two main branches:
human geography
physical geography

Other branches include:
integrated geography
technical geography
regional geography

All the branches are further described below...

Physical geography 

 Physical geography – examines the natural environment and how the climate, vegetation & life, soil, water, and landforms are produced and interact.

Fields of physical geography 

 Geomorphology – study of landforms and the processes that them, and more broadly, of the processes controlling the topography of any planet. Seeks to understand why landscapes look the way they do, to understand landform history and dynamics, and to predict future changes through field observation, physical experiment, and numerical modeling.
 Hydrology – study the movement, distribution, and quality of water throughout the Earth, including the hydrologic cycle, water resources and environmental watershed sustainability.
 Glaciology – study of glaciers, or more generally ice and natural phenomena that involve ice.
 Oceanography – studies a wide range of topics about oceans, including marine organisms and ecosystem dynamics; ocean currents, waves, and geophysical fluid dynamics; plate tectonics and the geology of the sea floor; and fluxes of various chemical substances and physical properties within the ocean and across its boundaries.
 Biogeography – study of the distribution of species spatially and temporally. Over areal ecological changes, it is also tied to the concepts of species and their past, or present living 'refugium', their survival locales, or their interim living sites. It aims to reveal where organisms live, and at what abundance.
 Climatology – study of climate, scientifically defined as weather conditions averaged over a period of time.
 Meteorology is the interdisciplinary scientific study of the atmosphere that focuses on weather processes and short term forecasting (in contrast with climatology).
 Pedology – study of soils in their natural environment that deals with pedogenesis, soil morphology, and soil classification.
 Palaeogeography – study of what the geography was in times past, most often concerning the physical landscape, but also the human or cultural environment.
 Coastal geography – study of the dynamic interface between the ocean and the land, incorporating both the physical geography (i.e. coastal geomorphology, geology and oceanography) and the human geography (sociology and history) of the coast. It involves an understanding of coastal weathering processes, particularly wave action, sediment movement and weather, and also the ways in which humans interact with the coast.
 Quaternary science – focuses on the Quaternary period, which encompasses the last 2.6 million years, including the last ice age and the Holocene period.
 Landscape ecology – the relationship between spatial patterns of urban development and ecological processes on a multitude of landscape scales and organizational levels.

Approaches of physical geography 

 Quantitative geography – Quantitative research tools and methods applied to geography. See also the quantitative revolution.
 Systems approach –

Human geography 

 Human geography – one of the two main subfields of geography, it is the study of human use and understanding of the world and the processes which have affected it. Human geography broadly differs from physical geography in that it focuses on the built environment and how space is created, viewed, and managed by humans as well as the influence humans have on the space they occupy.

Fields of human geography 

 Cultural geography – study of cultural products and norms and their variations across and relations to spaces and places. It focuses on describing and analyzing the ways language, religion, economy, government, and other cultural phenomena vary or remain constant from one place to another and on explaining how humans function spatially.
 Children's geographies – study of places and spaces of children's lives, characterized experientially, politically and ethically. Children's geographies rest on the idea that children as a social group share certain characteristics which are experientially, politically and ethically significant and which are worthy of study. The pluralization in the title is intended to imply that children's lives will be markedly different in differing times and places and in differing circumstances such as gender, family, and class. The range of foci within children's geographies include:
 Children and the city
 Children and the countryside
 Children and technology
 Children and nature,
 Children and globalization
 Methodologies of researching children's worlds
 Ethics of researching children's worlds
 Otherness of childhood
 Animal geographies – studies the spaces and places occupied by animals in human culture because social life and space is heavily populated by animals of many different kinds and in many differing ways (e.g. farm animals, pets, wild animals in the city). Another impetuses that has influenced the development of the field is ecofeminist and other environmentalist viewpoints on nature-society relations (including questions of animal welfare and rights).
 Language geography – studies the geographic distribution of language or its constituent elements. There are two principal fields of study within the geography of language:
 Geography of languages – deals with the distribution through history and space of languages,
 Linguistic geography – deals with regional linguistic variations within languages.
 Sexuality and space – encompasses all relationships and interactions between human sexuality, space, and place, including the geographies of LGBT residence, public sex environments, sites of queer resistance, global sexualities, sex tourism, the geographies of prostitution and adult entertainment, use of sexualised locations in the arts, and sexual citizenship.
 Religion geography – study of the influence of geography, i.e. place and space, on religious belief.
 Development geography – study of the Earth's geography with reference to the standard of living and quality of life of its human inhabitants. Measures development by looking at economic, political and social factors, and seeks to understand both the geographical causes and consequences of varying development, in part by comparing More Economically Developed Countries (MEDCs) with Less Economically Developed Countries (LEDCs).
 Economic geography – study of the location, distribution and spatial organization of economic activities across the world. Subjects of interest include but are not limited to the location of industries, economies of agglomeration (also known as "linkages"), transportation, international trade and development, real estate, gentrification, ethnic economies, gendered economies, core-periphery theory, the economics of urban form, the relationship between the environment and the economy (tying into a long history of geographers studying culture-environment interaction), and globalization.
 Marketing geography – a discipline within marketing analysis which uses geolocation (geographic information) in the process of planning and implementation of marketing activities. It can be used in any aspect of the marketing mix – the product, price, promotion, or place (geo targeting).
 Transportation geography – branch of economic geography that investigates spatial interactions between people, freight and information. It studies humans and their use of vehicles or other modes of traveling as well as how markets are serviced by flows of finished goods and raw materials.
 Health geography – application of geographical information, perspectives, and methods to the study of health, disease, and health care, to provide a spatial understanding of a population's health, the distribution of disease in an area, and the environment's effect on health and disease. It also deals with accessibility to health care and spatial distribution of health care providers.
 Time geography – study of the temporal factor on spatial human activities within the following constraints:
 Authority - limits of accessibility to certain places or domains placed on individuals by owners or authorities
 Capability - limitations on the movement of individuals, based on their nature. For example, movement is restricted by biological factors, such as the need for food, drink, and sleep
 Coupling - restraint of an individual, anchoring him or her to a location while interacting with other individuals in order to complete a task
 Historical geography – study of the human, physical, fictional, theoretical, and "real" geographies of the past, and seeks to determine how cultural features of various societies across the planet emerged and evolved, by understanding how a place or region changes through time, including how people have interacted with their environment and created the cultural landscape.
 Political geography – study of the spatially uneven outcomes of political processes and the ways in which political processes are themselves affected by spatial structures. Basically, the inter-relationships between people, state, and territory.
 Electoral geography – study of the relationship between election results and the regions they affect (such as the environmental impact of voting decisions), and of the effects of regional factors upon voting behavior.
 Geopolitics – analysis of geography, history and social science with reference to spatial politics and patterns at various scales, ranging from the level of the state to international.
 Strategic geography – concerned with the control of, or access to, spatial areas that affect the security and prosperity of nations.
 Military geography – the application of geographic tools, information, and techniques to solve military problems in peacetime or war.
 Population geography – study of the ways in which spatial variations in the distribution, composition, migration, and growth of populations are related to the nature of places.
 Tourism geography – study of travel and tourism, as an industry and as a social and cultural activity, and their effect on places, including the environmental impact of tourism, the geographies of tourism and leisure economies, answering tourism industry and management concerns and the sociology of tourism and locations of tourism.
 Urban geography – the study of urban areas, in terms of concentration, infrastructure, economy, and environmental impacts.

Approaches of human geography 

 
 
 
 
 
 
 
  –
 Qualitative geography – qualitative research tools and methods applied to geography.

Integrated geography 

 Integrated geography – branch of geography that describes the spatial aspects of interactions between humans and the natural world. It requires an understanding of the dynamics of geology, meteorology, hydrology, biogeography, ecology, and geomorphology, as well as the ways in which human societies conceptualize the environment.

Technical geography 

 Technical geography – branch of geography and the discipline of studying, developing, and applying methods to gather, store, process, and deliver geographic or spatially referenced information. It is a widespread interdisciplinary field that includes the tools and techniques used in land surveying, remote sensing, cartography, Geographic Information Systems (GIS), Global Navigation Satellite Systems, photogrammetry, and related forms of earth mapping.

Fields contributing to technical geography 

 
  
 
 
 
  
 
 Global navigation satellite systems represented by  – Any system that uses satellite radio signals to provide autonomous geo-spatial positioning

Regional geography 

Regional geography – study of world regions. Attention is paid to unique characteristics of a particular region such as its natural elements, human elements, and regionalization which covers the techniques of delineating space into regions. Regional geography breaks down into the study of specific regions.

Region – an area, defined by physical characteristics, human characteristics, or functional characteristics. The term is used in various ways among the different branches of geography. A region can be seen as a collection of smaller units, such as a country and its political divisions, or as one part of a larger whole, as in a country on a continent.

Continents 

Continent – one of several large landmasses on Earth. They are generally identified by convention rather than any specific criteria, but seven areas are commonly regarded as continents. They are:

1. Africa   (outline) –
2. Antarctica –
3. Australia   (outline) –
 The Americas:
4. North America   (outline) –
5. South America   (outline) –
 Eurasia:
6. Europe   (outline) –
7. Asia   (outline) –

Subregions 

Subregion (list)

Biogeographic regions

Biogeographic realm 

The World Wildlife Fund (WWF) developed a system of eight biogeographic realms (ecozones):
 Nearctic 22.9 mil. km2 (including most of North America)
 Palearctic 54.1 mil. km2 (including the bulk of Eurasia and North Africa)
 Afrotropic 22.1 mil. km2 (including Sub-Saharan Africa)
 Indomalaya 7.5 mil. km2 (including the South Asian subcontinent and Southeast Asia)
 Australasia 7.7 mil. km2 (including Australia, New Guinea, and neighboring islands). The northern boundary of this zone is known as the Wallace line.
 Neotropic 19.0 mil. km2 (including South America and the Caribbean)
 Oceania 1.0 mil. km2 (including Polynesia, Fiji and Micronesia)
 Antarctic 0.3 mil. km2 (including Antarctica).

Ecoregions 

Ecoregion
Biogeographic realms are further divided into ecoregions. The World has over 800 terrestrial ecoregions. See Lists of ecoregions by country.

Geography of the political divisions of the World 

 Geography of Africa   (Outline)
 West Africa#Geography and climate 
 Geography of Benin   (Outline)
 Geography of Burkina Faso   (Outline)
 Geography of Cape Verde   (Outline)
 Geography of Côte d'Ivoire   (Outline)
 Geography of Gambia   (Outline)
 Geography of Ghana   (Outline)
 Geography of Guinea   (Outline)
 Geography of Guinea-Bissau   (Outline)
 Geography of Liberia   (Outline)
 Geography of Mali   (Outline)
 Geography of Mauritania   (Outline)
 Geography of Niger   (Outline)
 Geography of Nigeria   (Outline)
 Geography of Senegal   (Outline)
 Geography of Sierra Leone   (Outline)
 Geography of Togo   (Outline)
 North Africa#Geography 
 Geography of Algeria   (Outline)
 Geography of Egypt   (Outline)
 Geography of Libya   (Outline)
 Geography of Mauritania   (Outline)
 Geography of Morocco   (Outline)
 Geography of Sudan   (Outline)
 Geography of Tunisia   (Outline)
 Geography of Western Sahara   (Outline)
 Central Africa 
 Geography of Angola   (Outline)
 Geography of Burundi   (Outline)
 Geography of Cameroon   (Outline)
 Geography of Central African Republic   (Outline)
 Geography of Chad   (Outline)
 Geography of Democratic Republic of the Congo   (Outline)
 Geography of Equatorial Guinea   (Outline)
 Geography of Gabon   (Outline)
 Geography of Republic of the Congo   (Outline)
 Geography of Rwanda   (Outline)
 Geography of São Tomé and Príncipe   (Outline)
 East Africa#Geography and climate 
 Geography of Burundi   (Outline)
 Geography of Comoros   (Outline)
 Geography of Djibouti   (Outline)
 Geography of Eritrea   (Outline)
 Geography of Ethiopia   (Outline)
 Geography of Kenya   (Outline)
 Geography of Madagascar   (Outline)
 Geography of Malawi   (Outline)
 Geography of Mauritius   (Outline)
 Geography of Mozambique   (Outline)
 Geography of Rwanda   (Outline)
 Geography of Seychelles   (Outline)
 Geography of Somalia   (Outline)
 Geography of Tanzania   (Outline)
 Geography of Uganda   (Outline)
 Geography of Zambia   (Outline)
 Geography of Zimbabwe   (Outline)
 Southern Africa#Geography 
 Geography of Botswana   (Outline)
 Geography of Lesotho   (Outline)
 Geography of Namibia   (Outline)
 Geography of South Africa   (Outline)
 Geography of Swaziland   (Outline)
 Dependencies in Africa
 Geography of British Indian Ocean Territory   (Outline) (UK)
 Geography of Mayotte   (Outline) (France)
 Geography of Réunion   (Outline) (France)
 Geography of Saint Helena   (Outline) (UK)
 Canary Islands#Geography   (Outline) (Spain)
 Geography of Ceuta   (Outline) (Spain)
 Geography of Madeira   (Outline) (Portugal)
 Geography of Melilla   (Outline) (Spain)
 Geography of Socotra   (Outline) (Yemen)
 Geography of Puntland   (Outline)
 Geography of Somaliland   (Outline)
 Sahrawi Arab Democratic Republic   (Outline)
 Geography of Antarctica   (Outline)
 Geography of Asia   (Outline)
 Central Asia#Geography
 Geography of Kazakhstan   (Outline)
 Geography of Kyrgyzstan   (Outline)
 Geography of Tajikistan   (Outline)
 Geography of Turkmenistan   (Outline)
 Geography of Uzbekistan   (Outline)
 East Asia
 Geography of China   (Outline)
 Geography of Tibet   (Outline)
 Geography of Hong Kong   (Outline)
 Geography of Macau   (Outline)
 Geography of Japan   (Outline)
 Geography of North Korea   (Outline)
 Geography of South Korea   (Outline)
 Geography of Mongolia   (Outline)
 Geography of Taiwan   (Outline)
 North Asia#Geography
 Geography of Russia   (Outline)
 Southeast Asia#Geography
 Geography of Brunei   (Outline)
 Burma (Myanmar) - Outline)
 Geography of Cambodia   (Outline)
 East Timor (Timor-Leste) - Outline)
 Geography of Indonesia   (Outline)
 Geography of Laos   (Outline)
 Geography of Malaysia   (Outline)
 Geography of the Philippines   (Outline)
 Geography of Singapore   (Outline)
 Geography of Thailand   (Outline)
 Geography of Vietnam   (Outline)
 South Asia#Geography
 Geography of Afghanistan   (Outline)
 Geography of Bangladesh   (Outline)
 Geography of Bhutan   (Outline)
 Geography of India   (Outline)
 Geography of Maldives   (Outline)
 Geography of Nepal   (Outline)
 Geography of Pakistan   (Outline)
 Geography of Sri Lanka   (Outline)
 Western Asia#Geography
 Armenia#Geography   (Outline)
 Geography of Azerbaijan   (Outline)
 Geography of Bahrain   (Outline)
 Geography of Cyprus   (Outline), including:
 Geography of Northern Cyprus   (Outline) (disputed territory)
 Georgia   (Outline)
 Geography of Iran   (Outline)
 Geography of Iraq   (Outline)
 Geography of Israel   (Outline)
 Geography of Jordan   (Outline)
 Geography of Kuwait   (Outline)
 Geography of Lebanon   (Outline)
 Geography of Oman   (Outline)
 Geography of the Palestinian territories   (Outline)
 Geography of Qatar   (Outline)
 Geography of Saudi Arabia   (Outline)
 Geography of Syria   (Outline)
 Geography of Turkey   (Outline)
 Geography of United Arab Emirates   (Outline)
 Geography of Yemen   (Outline)
 Caucasus#Geography and ecology (a region considered to be in both Asia and Europe, or between them)
 North Caucasus
 Geography of Russia   (Outline) (the following parts of Russia are in the North Caucasus: Chechnya, Ingushetia, Dagestan, Adyghea, Kabardino-Balkaria, Karachay–Cherkessia, North Ossetia, Krasnodar Krai, Stavropol Krai)
 South Caucasus
 Georgia   (Outline), including:
 Geography of Abkhazia   (Outline) (disputed territory)
 Geography of South Ossetia   (Outline) (disputed territory)
 Armenia#Geography   (Outline)
 Geography of Azerbaijan   (Outline), including:
 Geography of Nagorno-Karabakh   (Outline) (disputed territory)
 Geography of Europe   (Outline)
 Geography of Akrotiri and Dhekelia   (Outline)
 Geography of Åland   (Outline)
 Geography of Albania   (Outline)
 Geography of Andorra   (Outline)
 Geography of Armenia   (Outline)
 Geography of Austria   (Outline)
 Geography of Azerbaijan   (Outline)
 Geography of Belarus   (Outline)
 Geography of Belgium   (Outline)
 Geography of Bosnia and Herzegovina   (Outline)
 Geography of Bulgaria   (Outline)
 Geography of Croatia   (Outline)
 Geography of Cyprus   (Outline)
 Geography of Czech Republic   (Outline)
 Geography of Denmark   (Outline)
 Geography of Estonia   (Outline)
 Faroe Islands#Geography   (Outline)
 Geography of Finland   (Outline)
 Geography of France   (Outline)
 Geography of Georgia   (Outline)
 Geography of Germany   (Outline)
 Geography of Gibraltar   (Outline)
 Geography of Greece   (Outline)
 Geography of Guernsey   (Outline)
 Geography of Hungary   (Outline)
 Geography of Iceland   (Outline)
 Republic of Ireland#Geography   (Outline)
 Geography of the Isle of Man   (Outline)
 Geography of Italy   (Outline)
 Geography of Jersey   (Outline)
 Geography of Kazakhstan   (Outline)
 Geography of Kosovo   (Outline)
 Geography of Latvia   (Outline)
 Geography of Liechtenstein   (Outline)
 Geography of Lithuania   (Outline)

 Geography of Luxembourg   (Outline)
 Geography of Malta   (Outline)
 Geography of Moldova   (Outline), including:
 Geography of Transnistria   (Outline) (disputed territory)
 Geography of Monaco   (Outline)
 Geography of Montenegro   (Outline)
 Geography of Netherlands   (Outline)
 Geography of North Macedonia   (Outline)
 Geography of Norway   (Outline)
 Geography of Poland   (Outline)
 Geography of Portugal   (Outline)
 Geography of Romania   (Outline)
 Geography of Russia   (Outline)
 Geography of San Marino   (Outline)
 Geography of Serbia   (Outline)
 Geography of Slovakia   (Outline)
 Geography of Slovenia   (Outline)
 Geography of Spain   (Outline)
 Geography of Svalbard   (Outline)
 Geography of Sweden   (Outline)
 Geography of Switzerland   (Outline)
 Geography of Turkey   (Outline)
 Geography of Ukraine   (Outline)
 Geography of United Kingdom   (Outline)
 Geography of England   (Outline)
 Geography of Northern Ireland   (Outline)
 Geography of Scotland   (Outline)
 Geography of Wales   (Outline)
 Geography of Vatican City   (Outline)
 Geography of North America   (Outline)
 Geography of Canada   (Outline)
 By province
 Geography of Alberta
 Geography of British Columbia   (Outline)
 Geography of Manitoba
 Geography of New Brunswick
 Geography of Newfoundland and Labrador
 Geography of Nova Scotia
 Geography of Ontario
 Geography of Prince Edward Island
 Geography of Quebec   (Outline)
 Geography of Saskatchewan   (Outline)
 By territory
 Geography of the Northwest Territories
 Geography of Nunavut
 Geography of Yukon
 Geography of Greenland   (Outline)
 Geography of Mexico   (Outline)
 Geography of Saint Pierre and Miquelon   (Outline)
 Geography of United States   (Outline)
 Geography of Alabama   (Outline)
 Geography of Alaska   (Outline)
 Geography of Arizona   (Outline)
 Geography of Arkansas   (Outline)
 Geography of California   (Outline)
 Geography of Colorado   (Outline)
 Geography of Connecticut   (Outline)
 Geography of Delaware   (Outline)
 Geography of Florida   (Outline)
 Geography of Georgia   (Outline)
 Geography of Hawaii   (Outline)
 Geography of Idaho   (Outline)
 Geography of Illinois   (Outline)
 Geography of Indiana   (Outline)
 Geography of Iowa   (Outline)
 Geography of Montana   (Outline)
 Geography of Kansas   (Outline)
 Geography of Kentucky   (Outline)
 Geography of Louisiana   (Outline)
 Geography of Maine   (Outline)
 Geography of Maryland   (Outline)
 Geography of Massachusetts   (Outline)
 Geography of Michigan   (Outline)
 Geography of Minnesota   (Outline)
 Geography of Mississippi   (Outline)
 Geography of Missouri   (Outline)
 Geography of Nebraska   (Outline)
 Geography of Nevada   (Outline)
 Geography of New Hampshire   (Outline)
 Geography of New Jersey   (Outline)
 Geography of New Mexico   (Outline)
 Geography of New York   (Outline)
 Geography of North Carolina   (Outline)
 Geography of North Dakota   (Outline)
 Geography of Ohio   (Outline)
 Geography of Oklahoma   (Outline)
 Geography of Oregon   (Outline)
 Geography of Pennsylvania   (Outline)
 Geography of Rhode Island   (Outline)
 Geography of South Carolina   (Outline)
 Geography of South Dakota   (Outline)
 Geography of Tennessee   (Outline)
 Geography of Texas   (Outline)
 Geography of Utah   (Outline)
 Geography of Vermont   (Outline)
 Geography of Virginia   (Outline)
 Geography of Washington (state)   (Outline)
 Geography of West Virginia   (Outline)
 Geography of Wisconsin   (Outline)
 Geography of Wyoming   (Outline)
 Geography of Washington, D.C.   (Outline) (Washington, D.C.)
 Central America#Geography   (Outline)
 Geography of Belize   (Outline)
 Geography of Costa Rica   (Outline)
 Geography of El Salvador   (Outline)
 Geography of Guatemala   (Outline)
 Geography of Honduras   (Outline)
 Geography of Nicaragua   (Outline)
 Geography of Panama   (Outline)
 Geography of the Caribbean   (Outline)
 Geography of Anguilla   (Outline)
 Geography of Antigua and Barbuda   (Outline)
 Geography of Aruba   (Outline)
 Geography of Bahamas   (Outline)
 Geography of Barbados   (Outline)
 Geography of Bermuda   (Outline)
 British Virgin Islands#Geography   (Outline)
 Cayman Islands#Geography   (Outline)
 Geography of Cuba   (Outline)
 Geography of Dominica   (Outline)
 Dominican Republic#Geography   (Outline)
 Geography of Grenada   (Outline) 
 Geography of Haiti   (Outline)
 Geography of Jamaica   (Outline) 
 Geography of Montserrat   (Outline) 
 Netherlands Antilles#Geography   (Outline) 
 Geography of Puerto Rico   (Outline)
 Geography of Saint Barthélemy   (Outline)
 Geography of Saint Kitts and Nevis   (Outline)
 Geography of Saint Lucia   (Outline) 
 Saint Martin   (Outline)
 Geography of Saint Vincent and the Grenadines   (Outline)
 Geography of Trinidad and Tobago   (Outline) 
 Turks and Caicos Islands#Geography   (Outline)
 United States Virgin Islands#Geography   (Outline)
 Geography of Oceania (includes the continent of Australia)
 Australasia
 Geography of Australia   (Outline)
 Dependencies and territories of Australia
 Geography of Christmas Island   (Outline)
 Cocos (Keeling) Islands#Geography   (Outline)
 Geography of Norfolk Island   (Outline)
 Geography of New Zealand   (Outline)
 Geography of Melanesia
 Geography of Fiji   (Outline)
 Geography of Indonesia   (Outline) (Oceanian part only)
 Geography of New Caledonia   (Outline) (France)
 Geography of Papua New Guinea   (Outline)
 Geography of the Solomon Islands   (Outline)
 Geography of Vanuatu   (Outline)
 Geography of Micronesia
 Geography of Federated States of Micronesia   (Outline)
 Geography of Guam   (Outline) (USA)
 Geography of Kiribati   (Outline)
 Geography of Marshall Islands   (Outline)
 Geography of Nauru   (Outline)
 Northern Mariana Islands#Geography and climate   (Outline) (USA)
 Geography of Palau   (Outline)
 Geography of Wake Island   (Outline) (USA)
 Geography of Polynesia
 Geography of American Samoa   (Outline) (USA)
 Chatham Islands#Geography   (Outline) (NZ)
 Cook Islands#Geography   (Outline) (NZ)
 Easter Island#Location and physical geography   (Outline) (Chile)
 Geography of French Polynesia   (Outline) (France)
 Geography of Hawaii   (Outline) (USA)
 Loyalty Islands#Geography   (Outline) (France)
 Geography of Niue   (Outline) (NZ)
 Pitcairn Islands#Geography   (Outline) (UK)
 Geography of Samoa   (Outline)
 Geography of Tokelau   (Outline) (NZ)
 Geography of Tonga   (Outline)
 Geography of Tuvalu   (Outline)
 Geography of Wallis and Futuna   (Outline) (France)
 Geography of South America   (Outline)
 Geography of Argentina   (Outline)
 Geography of Bolivia   (Outline)
 Geography of Brazil   (Outline)
 Geography of Chile   (Outline)
 Geography of Colombia   (Outline)
 Geography of Ecuador   (Outline)
 Geography of the Falkland Islands   (Outline)
 Geography of French Guiana   (Outline)
 Geography of Guyana   (Outline)
 Geography of Paraguay   (Outline)
 Geography of Peru   (Outline)
 Geography of Suriname   (Outline)
 Geography of Uruguay   (Outline)
 Geography of Venezuela   (Outline)

Other regions 
 Atlantic World
 Bermuda Triangle
 Pacific Rim
 Pacific Ring of Fire

History of geography 

Topics pertaining to the geographical study of the World throughout history:

By period 
 Ancient roads
 Ancient Greek geography
 Age of discovery
 Major explorations after the Age of Discovery
 Critical geography
 Environmental determinism

By region

By subject 
 Historical population of the world

By field 
 History of human geography
 
 
 

 History of cultural geography
 History of economic geography

 History of health geography

 History of political geography

 History of demography

 History of physical geography
 History of biogeography
 History of climatology
 History of meteorology

 
 History of geomorphology
 History of hydrology

 History of oceanography

 History of landscape ecology

 History of regional geography

Elements of geography 
Topics common to the various branches of geography include:

Tasks and tools of geography

Types of geographic features 

Geographic feature – component of a planet that can be referred to as a location, place, site, area, or region, and therefore may show up on a map. A geographic feature may be natural or artificial.

Location and place

 Location –
 
 
 
 
 
 
 
 
 
 
 
 
 
 Place
 Aspects of a place or region

Natural geographic features 

Natural geographic feature – an ecosystem or natural landform.

Ecosystems 

Ecosystem – community of living organisms in conjunction with the nonliving components of their environment (things like air, water and mineral soil), interacting as a system. These biotic and abiotic components are regarded as linked together through nutrient cycles and energy flows. 
 
 Realm – broadest biogeographic division of the Earth's land surface, based on distributional patterns of terrestrial organisms. 
 Ecoprovince – biogeographic unit smaller than a realm that contains one or more ecoregions.

Natural landforms 

Natural landform – terrain or body of water. Landforms are topographical elements, and are defined by their surface form and location in the landscape. Landforms are categorized by traits such as elevation, slope, orientation, stratification, rock exposure, and soil type. Some landforms are artificial, such as certain islands, but most landforms are natural.

Natural terrain feature types

Natural body of water types 
 Natural 
 Bodies of 
 
 
 
 
 
 
 
 
 
 
   
 
 
 
 
 
 Arm of the sea –
 
 
 
 
 
 Types of sea:
 
 
 Sea components or extensions:
 
 
 
 Bodies of fresh water
 
 
 
 
 
 
 
 
 
 
 
 
  
 
 Parts of a river:
 
 
 
 
 
 
 Boil -
 
 
 
 
 
 
 
 
 
 
 Freshwater

Artificial geographic features 
Artificial geographic feature – a thing that was made by humans that may be indicated on a map. It may be physical and exist in the real world (like a bridge or city), or it may be abstract and exist only on maps (such as the Equator, which has a defined location, but cannot be seen where it lies).

 
  – rural settlement which is too small to be considered a village. Historically, when a hamlet became large enough to justify building a church, it was then classified as a village. One example of a hamlet is a small cluster of houses surrounding a mill.
  – clustered human settlement or community, larger than a hamlet with the population ranging from a few hundred to a few thousand (sometimes tens of thousands).
  – human settlement larger than a village but smaller than a city. The size a settlement must be in order to be called a "town" varies considerably in different parts of the world, so that, for example, many American "small towns" seem to British people to be no more than villages, while many British "small towns" would qualify as cities in the United States.
  – ranks the structure of towns within an area.
  – bare minimum of essential services, such as bread and milk.
 
 
 
  – relatively large and permanent settlement. In many regions, a city is distinguished from a town by attainment of designation according to law, for instance being required to obtain articles of incorporation or a royal charter.
 
  – the leading city in its country or region, disproportionately larger than any others in the urban hierarchy.
  – very large city or urban area which is a significant economic, political and cultural center for a country or region, and an important hub for regional or international connections and communications.
  – region consisting of a densely populated urban core and its less-populated surrounding territories, sharing industry, infrastructure, and housing.
  – city that is deemed to be an important node in the global economic system. Globalization is largely created, facilitated and enacted in strategic geographic locales (including global cities) according to a hierarchy of importance to the operation of the global system of finance and trade.
  – chain of roughly adjacent metropolitan areas. An example is the huge metropolitan area along the eastern seaboard of the U.S. extending from Boston, Massachusetts through New York City; Philadelphia, Pennsylvania; Baltimore, Maryland and ending in Washington, D.C..
  – theoretical "continent city". The world does not have one yet. Will Europe become the first one?
  – theoretical "world city". Will the world ever become so urbanized as to be called this?
 Engineered construct – built feature of the landscape such as a highway, bridge, airport, railroad, building, dam, or reservoir. See also construction engineering and infrastructure.
 Artificial landforms
 
 
 
  – place where airplanes can take off and land, including one or more runways and one or more passenger terminals.
  – artificial channel that is constructed to convey water from one location to another.
  – construction designed to break the force of the sea to provide calm water for boats or ships, or to prevent erosion of a coastal feature.
  – structure built to span a valley, road, body of water, or other physical obstacle such as a canyon, for the purpose of providing passage over the obstacle.
  – closed structure with walls and a roof.
  – artificial waterway, often connecting one body of water with another.
 
  – structure placed across a flowing body of water to stop the flow, usually to use the water for irrigation or to generate electricity.
  – barrier of stone or earth used to hold back water and prevent flooding.
  – artificial slope or wall to regulate water levels, usually earthen and often parallel to the course of a river or the coast.
  – place where agricultural activities take place, especially the growing of crops or the raising of livestock.
  – harbor that has deliberately constructed breakwaters, sea walls, or jettys, or which was constructed by dredging.
 
 
 
 
 
 
 
 
 
 
 
 
 
 
 
 
 
 
 
 
 

 Abstract geographic feature – does not exist physically in the real world, yet has a location by definition and may be displayed on maps.
 
 
 
 
 
 
 
  – a designated territory created within a country for administrative or identification purposes. Examples of the types of administrative divisions:

 Cartographical feature – theoretical construct used specifically on maps that doesn't have any physical form apart from its location.

Geographic features that include the natural and artificial

Geography awards

Some awards and competitions in the field of geography:

Geographical organizations 
 See: List of geographical societies

European Geography Association
EUROGEO-European Association of Geographers
Gamma Theta Upsilon
International Geographical Union

Geographical publications

Geographical magazines 
 Al Arab
 Arizona Highways
 Asian Geographic
 Atlas (magazine)
 Australian Geographic
 Canadian Geographic
 Chinese National Geography
 Le Congo illustré
 GEO (magazine)
 Géographica
 Geographical
 Icelandic Geographic
 Le Mouvement Géographique
 National Geographic
 National Geographic Adventure
 National Geographic Kids
 National Geographic Traveler
 New Zealand Geographic
 Podróże
 Revista Geográfica Española
 Rhythms Monthly
 Vokrug sveta
 Walkabout
 The Wide World Magazine

Persons influential in geography 

A geographer is a scientist who studies Earth's physical environment and human habitat. Geographers are historically known for making maps, the subdiscipline of geography known as cartography. They study the physical details of the environment and also its effect on human and wildlife ecologies, weather and climate patterns, economics, and culture. Geographers focus on the spatial relationships between these elements.

Influential physical geographers 

 Eratosthenes (276194 BC) – who made the first known reliable estimation of the Earth's size. He is considered the father of geodesy.
 Ptolemy (c. 168) – who compiled Greek and Roman knowledge to produce the book Geographia.
 Abū Rayhān Bīrūnī (9731048 AD) – considered the father of geodesy.
 Ibn Sina (Avicenna, 980–1037) – whose observations in Kitab Al-Shifa contributed to later formulations of the law of superposition and concept of uniformitarianism.
 Muhammad al-Idrisi (Dreses, 1100c.1165) – who drew the Tabula Rogeriana, the most accurate world map in pre-modern times.
 Piri Reis (1465c.1554) – whose Piri Reis map is the oldest surviving world map to include the Americas and possibly Antarctica
 Gerardus Mercator (1512–1594) – an innovative cartographer and originator of the Mercator projection.
 Bernhardus Varenius (1622–1650) – Wrote his important work "General Geography" (1650) – first overview of the geography, the foundation of modern geography.
 Mikhail Lomonosov (1711–1765) – father of Russian geography and founded the study of glaciology.
 Alexander Von Humboldt (1769–1859) – considered the father of modern geography. Published Kosmos and founded the study of biogeography.
 Arnold Henry Guyot (1807–1884) – who noted the structure of glaciers and advanced the understanding of glacial motion, especially in fast ice flow.
 Louis Agassiz (1807–1873) – the author of a glacial theory which disputed the notion of a steady-cooling Earth.
 Alfred Russel Wallace (1823–1913) – founder of modern biogeography and the Wallace line.
 Vasily Dokuchaev (1846–1903) – patriarch of Russian geography and founder of pedology.
 Wladimir Peter Köppen (1846–1940) – developer of most important climate classification and founder of Paleoclimatology.
 William Morris Davis (1850–1934) – father of American geography, founder of Geomorphology and developer of the geographical cycle theory.
 Walther Penck (1888–1923) – proponent of the cycle of erosion and the simultaneous occurrence of uplift and denudation.
 Sir Ernest Shackleton (1874–1922) – Antarctic explorer during the Heroic Age of Antarctic Exploration.
 Robert E. Horton (1875–1945) – founder of modern hydrology and concepts such as infiltration capacity and overland flow.
 J Harlen Bretz (1882–1981) – pioneer of research into the shaping of landscapes by catastrophic floods, most notably the Bretz (Missoula) floods.
 Willi Dansgaard (born 1922) – palaeoclimatologist and quaternary scientist, instrumental in the use of oxygen-isotope dating and co-identifier of Dansgaard-Oeschger events.
 Hans Oeschger (1927–1998) – palaeoclimatologist and pioneer in ice core research, co-identifier of Dansgaard-Orschger events.
 Richard Chorley (1927–2002) – a key contributor to the quantitative revolution and the use of systems theory in geography.
 Sir Nicholas Shackleton (1937–2006) – who demonstrated that oscillations in climate over the past few million years could be correlated with variations in the orbital and positional relationship between the Earth and the Sun.
 Stefan Rahmstorf (born 1960) – professor of abrupt climate changes and author on theories of thermohaline dynamics.

Influential human geographers 

 Carl Ritter (1779–1859) – considered to be one of the founding fathers of modern geography and first chair in geography at the Humboldt University of Berlin, also noted for his use of organic analogy in his works.
 Friedrich Ratzel (1844–1904) – environmental determinist, invented the term Lebensraum
 Paul Vidal de la Blache (1845–1918) – founder of the French School of geopolitics and possibilism.
 Sir Halford John Mackinder (1861–1947) – author of The Geographical Pivot of History, co-founder of the London School of Economics, along with the Geographical Association.
 Carl O. Sauer (1889–1975) – critic of environmental determinism and proponent of cultural ecology.
 Walter Christaller (1893–1969) – economic geographer and developer of the central place theory.
 Richard Hartshorne (1899–1992) – scholar of the history and philosophy of geography.
 Torsten Hägerstrand (1916–2004) – critic of the quantitative revolution and regional science, noted figure in critical geography.
 Milton Santos (1926–2001) winner of the Vautrin Lud prize in 1994, one of the most important geographers in South America.
 Waldo R. Tobler (born 1930) – developer of the First law of geography.
 Yi-Fu Tuan (born 1930) A Chinese-American geographer.
 David Harvey (born 1935) – world's most cited academic geographer and winner of the Lauréat Prix International de Géographie Vautrin Lud, also noted for his work in critical geography and critique of global capitalism.
 Evelyn Stokes (1936–2005). Professor of geography at the University of Waikato in New Zealand. Known for recognizing inequality with marginalized groups including women and Māori using geography.
 Allen J. Scott (born 1938) – winner of Vautrin Lud Prize in 2003 and the Anders Retzius Gold medal 2009; author of numerous books and papers on economic and urban geography, known for his work on regional development, new industrial spaces, agglomeration theory, global city-regions and the cultural economy.
 Edward Soja (born 1941) – noted for his work on regional development, planning and governance, along with coining the terms synekism and postmetropolis.
 Doreen Massey (born 1944) – key scholar in the space and places of globalization and its pluralities, winner of the Vautrin Lud Prize.
 Michael Watts, Class of 1963 Professor of Geography and Development Studies, University of California, Berkeley
 Nigel Thrift (born 1949) – developer of non-representational theory.
 Derek Gregory (born 1951) – famous for writing on the Israeli, U.S. and UK actions in the Middle East after 9/11, influenced by Edward Said and has contributed work on imagined geographies.
 Cindi Katz (born 1954) – who writes on social reproduction and the production of space. Writing on children's geographies, place and nature, everyday life and security.
 Gillian Rose (born 1962) – most famous for her critique: Feminism & Geography: The Limits of Geographical Knowledge (1993) – which was one of the first moves towards a development of feminist geography.

Geography educational frameworks 
Educational frameworks upon which primary and secondary school curricula for geography are based upon include:

  
  – a position or point that something occupies on the Earth's surface.
 
 
 movement –
 
 The six "essential elements" identified by the Geography Education Standards Project, under which the National Geography Standards they developed are organized:
 The World in spatial terms
 Places and regions
 Physical systems
 Human systems
 Environment and society
 The uses of geography
 The three content areas of geography from the 2010 National Assessment of Educational Progress (U.S.):
 Space and place
 Environment and society
 Spatial dynamics and connections

See also 

 Gazetteer
 Geographer
 Geographical renaming
 Geography and places reference tables
 Landform
 List of explorers
 List of Russian explorers
 Map
 Navigator
 Philosophy of geography
 World map

References

External links 

 Pidwirny, Michael. (2014). Glossary of Terms for Physical Geography. Planet Earth Publishing, Kelowna, Canada. . Available on Google Play.
 Pidwirny, Michael. (2014). Understanding Physical Geography. Planet Earth Publishing, Kelowna, Canada. . Available on Google Play.

Geography
Geography
 1